Lê Văn Thắng (born 8 February 1990) is a Vietnamese footballer who plays as a winger, striker for Vietnamese club Thanh Hóa and the Vietnamese national team.

Club career

Hải Phòng
Văn Thắng signed a 1-year deal with Hải Phòng in November 2015. Early departure Van Thang trained in youth football in Nghe An in 2003, then due to family events joined the youth of Thanh Hoa in 2005.

In the 2014 case of the players of the Ninh Binh betting at the AFC Cup 2014, Le Van Thang is considered not participating in the settlement but has know and get 20 million. Van Thang signed a contract for XSKT Cần Thơ. 
 
Van Thang was an orphan early in his life, at 5 he lost his father, and by the time he was 15, he lost his mother. Le Van Thang is also one of the players registered to play the youngest national champion in history when he was 17 years old in Halida Thanh Hoá in the V-league 2007.

At the end of the 2015 season at the V.League 1, he became the top scorer. By the end of 2015, Van Thang was also officially transferred to the football club Hai Phong Hai Phong Football Club.

Thanh Hóa
In early May 2017 Văn Thắng rejoined boyhood club FLC Thanh Hóa for the rest of the 2017 season.

International goals

Scores and results list Vietnam's goal tally first.

Title 
AFC Cup
 At the AFC Cup 2014, Van Thang came out eight times and scored three goals.
V.League-1
 Silver Medal (1): 2016 V.League 1
Vietnamese Cup
 Bronze medal (2): 2011 Vietnamese Cup, 2022 Vietnamese Cup
 Silver Medal (2): 2014, 2018 Vietnamese Cup
 Gold Medal (1): 2009

References 

1990 births
Living people
Vietnamese footballers
Association football wingers
Association football forwards
V.League 1 players
Thanh Hóa FC players
Can Tho FC players
Haiphong FC players
People from Thanh Hóa province
Vietnam international footballers
Footballers at the 2010 Asian Games
Asian Games competitors for Vietnam